Omnia Shawkat (born 1987) is a Sudanese journalist, digital stories and cross-cultural curator. She is co-founder and manager of the cultural online platform Andariya, based in Sudan, South Sudan and Uganda, covering other countries in East Africa and the Horn of Africa as well.

Since 2015, she has become known for her activities in East Africa of networking for online media and cultural journalism. In her own articles about women's rights as well as women's involvement in society and media, she has published analytical discussions on the contribution of women to the Sudanese revolution, as well as on the importance of digital media for civic engagement.

Career 
According to #defyhatenow, a community based organisation registered in South Sudan, Shawkat graduated with a Bachelor of Science in Biology with a focus on Environmental Studies from the American University in Cairo in 2008. She has a Master’s Degree in Environment and Resource Management with a focus on Water and Climate Policy from the Vrije Universiteit in Amsterdam, the Netherlands. She first worked in development and environmental management for a number of years, but changed her professional activities to cultural management and online journalism, when she returned to Khartoum, Sudan.

Andariya online magazine 

In 2015, she and fellow Sudanese Salma Amin started Andariya, a bilingual online multimedia cultural platform and enterprise. Andariya was launched both in Sudan and South Sudan and expanded into Uganda in 2018. Since its start, this online magazine has been operating with a team of editors and graphic designers in both Sudans and more than 100 freelance creators in several countries. Andariya strives to provide stories about contemporary life in  the Sudans and other countries in East Africa and thereby connecting their readers across borders. Operating without commercial sponsors, the magazine strives to provide independent, gender and technology focused digital news with a special focus on urban culture, regional diversity and digital graphic design of its texts, videos and images. Addressing a worldwide audience, all content is published both in Arabic and English.

As part of its activities to research and build databases on cultural developments in the region, Andariya magazine received a research grant by AFAC (Arab Fund for Arts and Culture) to collect, publish and share empirical case studies and analyzed data from five different cities representing the highest and most dynamic artistic and grassroots activism and influence during the Sudanese revolution of 2018/2019.

Advocacy for women's contribution to society and media 

Shawkat and Amin also advocate for women’s rights in the workplace and society at large. As reported by online news portal Arabnet, Shawkat was a speaker at a womenomics event in 2017 to discuss how the new generation can evolve professionally beyond the traditional workplace, blending creativity with business success, market share, and independence.

In their 2019 article entitled "Sudanese Women at the Heart of the Revolution", Shawkat and Sudanese journalist Reem Gaafar explain the reasons, actions and vital role of Sudanese women before and during the Sudanese revolution. An important aspect in their analysis is the role that social media platforms have provided for the revolutionary mobilisation, where traditional media have failed.

See also 
 Media of Sudan
 Mass media in South Sudan
Sudanese revolution

Further reading 
 Cultural Journalism at Oxford Research Encyclopedias

References

External links 
Andariya's official website
Cultural articles by Omnia Shawkat in other media
Omnia Shawkat and Salma Amin at 21 Young Sudanese Women you should know about

Sudanese women activists
Living people
Sudanese mass media people
1987 births
People from Omdurman
The American University in Cairo alumni
Vrije Universiteit Amsterdam alumni
Sudanese journalists
Sudanese women journalists